Gerhard Ritter von Rosselmini or Gerhard Rosselmini or Gerhard Roselmini (c. 1742 – 19 November 1796) became a general officer in the Austrian army during the French Revolutionary Wars and fought in several actions against Napoleon Bonaparte's French army during the 1796 Italian campaign.

Career

Oberst Rosselmini commanded the Kaiser Infantry Regiment # 1 from 1789 to 1794. He led his regiment in Dagobert von Wurmser's Army of the Upper Rhine, fighting at Bad Bergzabern and Bienwaldmühle on 12 and 20 September. He also fought at the First Battle of Wissembourg on 13 October.  He won promotion to General-Major on 20 February 1794. He held the noble title of Ritter.

During the Montenotte Campaign in April 1796, Rosselmini commanded a brigade in Johann Beaulieu's army. At the end of March, his battalions lay in their winter quarters at Lodi, far from the front. Consequently, he did not participate in any of the early battles. During the retreat behind the Po River, he covered the army's flank by initially moving along the south bank of the river. His command finally crossed to the north bank south of Pavia on 4 May.

At the Battle of Lodi in May, Rosselmini led a 900-man covering force that held Lodi until Josef Vukassovich's rearguard passed safely. Just before mid-day, the French advance guard attacked Rosselmini and drove him back through the town. His infantry battalion joined Karl Sebottendorf's first line during the main action while his cavalry trotted back to support the second line.
 
Before the Battle of Borghetto, Beaulieu assigned Rosselmini's brigade to join the defenders of the Mantua fortress. During the first part of the Siege of Mantua, Rosselmini held the citadel with 3,666 soldiers in five battalions. When the siege was briefly raised in early August, Wurmser reassigned him outside the fortress.

During the third relief of Mantua, Rosselmini commanded one of four brigades in Giovanni di Provera's Main Body. He died in Vicenza on 19 November 1796, or two days after the Battle of Arcole. It is not known if he died from wounds suffered in the campaign or from another cause.

References

Books
 Boycott-Brown, Martin. The Road to Rivoli. London: Cassell & Co., 2001. 
 
 Wrede, Alphons. Geschichte der K. und K. Wehrmacht, Vol. 1. Vienna: L. W. Seidel & Sohn, 1898.

External links
 Austrian Generals by Antonio Schmidt-Brentano
 "Rosselmini, Gerhard Ritter von" by Digby Smith, compiled by Leopold Kudrna
 Austrian Infantry Regiments 1 to 10 by Stephen Millar

Footnotes

Austrian generals
Austrian knights
Italian soldiers
Austrian soldiers
Austrian Empire military leaders of the French Revolutionary Wars
Military leaders of the French Revolutionary Wars
1740s births
1796 deaths